Crowne Plaza Chennai Adyar Park, formerly the Sheraton Park Hotel & Towers, is a five-star hotel located on TTK Road in Chennai, India.

History
The Adyar Gate Hotel, as it was originally called, was built in the late 1970s on the site of the gates to an old "garden house". Later named the Sheraton Park Hotel), it was built by Adyar Gate Hotels Limited (AGHL), a hotel company which owns four hotels in India, the other three being 105 room Intercontinental Resort Mahabalipuram, 104-room Welcome Hotel Grand Bay in Vizag and 67-room Fortune Hotel Sullivan Court in Ooty. Incorporated in 1970 (as a private limited entity), the company was originally promoted by T. T. Vasu (one of the promoters of T. T. Krishnamachari group, also known as the TTK group) and K. R. Veerappan. In 1975, the company became a public limited company. There were no operations in the company until 1979, when a group of NRIs took controlling interest in AGHL and started construction of the hotel in Chennai in 1981, which is the flagship property of the company. The hotel commenced operation with a tie-up with Holiday Inn.

Originally built as the "Adayar Park Hotel" by AGHL, the 250-room hotel was taken over by Welcomgroup Hotels in February 1985, when the controlling stake in the company was acquired by Goyal family, the present promoters, for a sum of  30 million. The group then renamed the hotel as Sheraton Park Hotel & Towers with tie up with Starwood for using the Sheraton brand. All the three properties of AGHL were managed by ITC Hotels.

The hotel was renamed the "Crowne Plaza Chennai Adyar Park" on May 1, 2015, after it was acquired by the Intercontinental Hotel Group.

The hotel
The hotel consists of a 6-storied building, an adjacent 8-storied tower block and a 2-storied service block. The hotel has 283 rooms including 38 suites and 5 restaurants. Of the 283 rooms, about 140 rooms are located in the tower wing of the hotel. Restaurants and bars include "The Residency" (International cuisine restaurant in an Edwardian era setting), "Cappuccino" (the 24-hr international coffee shop located at Lobby level overlooking the poolside), the "Westminster bar" (located at Lobby level and overlooking the poolside), "On the Rocks" (international cuisine restaurant), "Dakshin" (authentic south Indian cuisine restaurant), "Gatsby2000" (themed discotheque club that can accommodate about 600 people) and "Connexions" (a Hi-tea lounge).

The hotel has 8 meeting spaces. There are 3 banquet halls with 9,000 sq ft of meeting space to accommodate up to 500 guests, mid-size halls to accommodate 20 to 30 guests and 3 board rooms with seating capacity ranging from 20 to 50 people. In addition, there are also 4 banquet halls with up to 12,000 sq ft of meeting space to accommodate up to 1,200 people and 3 board rooms with seating capacity ranging from 10 to 20 people. The hotel's underground parking can accommodate 200 to 250 cars.

See also

 Hotels in Chennai

References

Hotels in Chennai
Crowne Plaza hotels
1981 establishments in Tamil Nadu
Hotels established in 1981
Hotel buildings completed in 1981
ITC Limited
20th-century architecture in India